The Vatican loggias are a corridor space in the Apostolic Palace, originally open to the elements on one side, which were decorated in fresco around 1519 by Raphael's large team of artists, with Giovanni da Udine the main hand involved.  Because of the relative unimportance of the space, and a desire to copy the recently re-discovered Domus Aurea style of Ancient Roman painting, no large paintings were used, and the surfaces were mostly covered with grotesque designs on a white background, with paintings imitating sculptures in niches, and small figurative subjects in a revival of Ancient Roman style. This large array provided a repertoire of elements that were the basis for later artists creating grotesque decoration across Europe.

The logge now form part of the ceremonial route for distinguished visitors, but are otherwise on the tourist route.

See also
 Raphael Rooms

Notes

References

Wilson, Timothy, Ceramic Art of the Italian Renaissance, 1987, British Museum Publications, 

Apostolic Palace
Raphael
Loggias